Orljava is a river in Slavonia, eastern Croatia, a left tributary of Sava.

Orljava rises in the mountainous forested areas of Psunj, south of Bučje. It receives influx from smaller rivers that rise in the mountains of Papuk and Požeška gora. Near Srednje Selo it starts turning southeast, and at Pleternica it merges with the river Londža that rises in Krndija. It then runs south to pass between Požeška gora and Dilj, when it turns to the southwest.

There are several etymologies suggested for the hydronym. One is that it comes from the Croatian word "oriti", meaning "echo". The other is that it comes from the Indo-European root *h1or, meaning "to flow". If so, then the same root is seen in the hydronym "Raša".

References

Rivers of Croatia
Slavonia
Landforms of Brod-Posavina County
Landforms of Požega-Slavonia County